Berlin: Live at St. Ann's Warehouse is a concert film and live album by Lou Reed released in 2008. The concert film was directed by Julian Schnabel, live at St. Ann's Warehouse in Brooklyn during five nights in December 2006. Background shots of the characters Jim and Caroline were done by Lola Schnabel.

The Berlin tour was the first time Lou Reed had played the full album live in over 30 years, after the original album was a critical and commercial disappointment (in spite of it being a top 10 album hitting #7 in the UK and going Silver). Individual songs had been played, but not the entire album.

The concert film and album both feature three non-Berlin songs as an encore, "Candy Says", "Rock Minuet" and "Sweet Jane".

Track listing
All tracks composed by Lou Reed

 "Intro" – 1:51
 "Berlin" – 2:34
 "Lady Day" – 4:12
 "Men of Good Fortune" – 6:35
 "Caroline Says (I)" – 4:31
 "How Do You Think It Feels?" – 5:37
 "Oh, Jim" – 8:16
 "Caroline Says (II)" – 4:33
 "The Kids" – 8:08
 "The Bed" – 5:59
 "Sad Song" – 8:21
 "Candy Says" – 6:04
 "Rock Minuet" – 7:18
 "Sweet Jane" – 5:31

Personnel
Lou Reed – lead vocals, guitar
Steve Hunter – guitars
Fernando Saunders – bass guitar, synthesizer, guitar, backing vocals
Tony "Thunder" Smith – drums, backing vocals
Rupert Christie – keyboards, backing vocals
Rob Wasserman – double bass
Sharon Jones – vocals
Antony Hegarty – vocals
Steven Bernstein – flugelhorn, trumpet
Curtis Fowlkes – trombone
Paul Shapiro – saxophone, flute
Doug Wieselman – bass clarinet, clarinet
David Gold – viola
Eyvind Kang – viola
Jane Scarpantoni – cello
Brooklyn Youth Chorus – choir
Bob Ezrin - conductor

References

External links 
 
 
 
 Berlin at setlist.fm

Albums produced by Bob Ezrin
Albums produced by Hal Willner
2007 films
American documentary films
Concert films
Films directed by Julian Schnabel
Lou Reed video albums
Live video albums
Lou Reed live albums
2008 live albums
2008 video albums
2000s English-language films
2000s American films